Covered Wagon Days is a 1940 American Western "Three Mesquiteers" B-movie directed by George Sherman.

Cast
 Robert Livingston as Stony Brooke
 Raymond Hatton as Rusty Joslin
 Duncan Renaldo as Rico Rinaldo
 Kay Griffith as Maria
 George Douglas as Ransome
 Ruth Robinson as Mama Rinaldo
 Paul Marion as Carlos Rinaldo
 John Merton as Henchman
 Tom Chatterton as Maj. J.A. Norton
 Guy D'Ennery as Don Diego
 Tom London as Martin
 Reed Howes as Henchman

References

External links
 
 

1940 films
1940 Western (genre) films
American Western (genre) films
1940s English-language films
American black-and-white films
Films directed by George Sherman
Republic Pictures films
Three Mesquiteers films
1940s American films